Tnine Aglou is a small town and rural commune in Tiznit Province of the Souss-Massa-Drâa region of Morocco. At the time of the 2004 census, the commune had a total population of 14,632 people living in 3,128 households.

The town is home to, "Ribat al-Murabitin" one of Morocco's oldest Ribats where the founder of the Almoravid dynasty, Abdallah ibn Yasin studied under Waggag ibn Zallu al-Lamti who was buried there.

References

Rural communes of Souss-Massa
Populated places in Tiznit Province